Badra "Beneko" Samaké (born 12 December 1998) is a Malian basketball player who plays for AS Police.

Professional career
Samaké plays for AS Police and as the captain of the team, he helped the team qualify for the inaugural BAL season.

National team career
He played with Mali U19 at the 2017 U19 World Cup. He also played with the Mali senior team at FIBA AfroCan 2019.

BAL career statistics

|-
| style="text-align:left;"|2021
| style="text-align:left;"|AS Police
| 2 || 1 || 13.2 || .125 || .000 || .500 || 1.5 || 1.5 || .5 || .0 || 2.0
|-
|- class="sortbottom"
| style="text-align:center;" colspan="2"|Career
| 2 || 1 || 13.2 || .125 || .000 || .500 || 1.5 || 1.5 || .5 || .0 || 2.0

References

External links
Proballers profile
RealGM profile

1998 births
Living people
AS Police basketball players
Malian men's basketball players
21st-century Malian people